Thomas J. McCarthy Murphy (1861–1933) was a lawyer and politician in Newfoundland. He represented St. John's East in the Newfoundland House of Assembly from 1886 to 1894 and from 1897 to 1904.

The son of Thomas Murphy and Catherine McCarthy, he was born in St. John's and was educated at Saint Bonaventure's College. Murphy studies law with John Hoyles Boone and went on to practice in the same office; he was admitted to the bar in 1886.. Murphy ran unsuccessfully for the Harbour Main seat in the Newfoundland assembly in 1885 before being elected in a by-election held in St. John's East the following year. He was unseated in 1894 and then reelected in 1897.

He married Margaret Kearney. Murphy served as crown prosecutor, as a member of the Fisheries Commission and as governor of the Savings Bank. In 1904, he was named deputy minister of justice. He retired from that post in 1907 to return to the practice of law.

References 

Members of the Newfoundland and Labrador House of Assembly
1861 births
1933 deaths
Newfoundland Colony people
Dominion of Newfoundland people